Adenain is an enzyme. This enzyme catalyses the following chemical reaction

 Cleaves proteins of the adenovirus and its host cell at two consensus sites: -Yaa-Xaa-Gly-Gly-Xaa- and -Yaa-Xaa-Gly-Xaa-Gly- (in which Yaa is Met, Ile or Leu, and Xaa is any amino acid)

This cysteine endopeptidase is encoded by adenoviruses.

References

External links 
 

EC 3.4.22